Boa imperator (or Boa constrictor imperator (in common usage)) is a large, heavy-bodied, nonvenomous species of snake in the genus Boa that is commonly kept in captivity. Boa imperator is part of the family Boidae and is found in Mexico, Central America and South America west of the Andes Mountains (primarily in Colombia). It is commonly called the Central American boa, northern boa, common boa, common northern boa and Colombian boa and is frequently and erroneously referred to as the  red-tailed boa  or  Colombian red-tailed boa, especially in the pet trade.

Description 

Boa imperator is a wide-ranging species, living in both Central America and the northern parts of South America. As a result, the appearance of this snake varies greatly depending on the specific locality. As one of the smaller Boa species, they average between 1.3 m (4.2 ft.) and 2.5 m (8.2 ft.) in length when fully grown, but have been known to reach 3.7 m (12 ft.). They usually weigh around 6 kg (13 lb), although females are significantly larger than males. Lifespan in the wild is around 20–30 years, but 40 can be exceeded in captivity. 

Although Boa imperator exhibits almost identical patterns to Boa constrictor, this species often has a darker tail, usually dark brown or very dark red. They are, however, usually just as colorful as their counterparts and, like the larger boas, can be bred into a variety of different colors, given the right conditions to breed.

Notably, the species is one of only two in snakes to have a confirmed XY sex chromosome system.

One population is found on the Cayos Cochinos (Hog Islands) off the northern shore of Honduras. These are naturally hypomelanistic, which means that they have reduced melanin, thus are more lightly colored, although they retain the distinctive darker tail that is characteristic of most members of this species. The color of the tail may vary from salmon-pink to orange.

Another well-known population of Boa imperator is the population from Nicaragua. which typically have a compact saddle pattern on their backs that is often circular in shape. 

Mainland specimens from Colombia can be among the larger boas, but this species also includes a number of island dwarf populations, such as those from various Caribbean islands. These populations represent the smallest members of the species.

Scalation  
Boa imperator has 55–79 dorsal scales, 225–253 ventral scales, 47–69 subcaudal scales, 18–22 supralabial scales and 1–2 anal scales.

Identification 

Boa imperator is commonly confused with other Boa species, such as Boa constrictor.

Taxonomy 
Boa imperator was formerly classified as a subspecies of Boa constrictor until DNA sequencing identified B. c. imperator as a separate genetic lineage with 5-7% divergence from B. constrictor. Widespread acceptance is still pending, but several publications have acknowledged the new name since this finding.

The Boa imperator population from the Pacific Coast of Mexico has been separated as another species, Boa sigma.

Certain Boa imperator populations such as the ones in the Cayos Cochinos (or the Hog Islands); the Corn Islands; Tarahumara, Mexico; Ecuador; etc. are currently classified as different "locales" of Boa imperator. These locales have yet to be officially reclassified as subspecies.

Geographic range 
Boa imperator can be found in some regions of Mexico, Central America and northwestern Colombia, as well as several islands along the coasts of these areas. The type locality given is "l'Amerique meridionale, principalement au Mexique" (Central America, principally Mexico).

Boa imperator prefers to live in rainforests due to humidity, temperature, cover from potential predators and ample prey.

Behavior 
Boa imperator generally live on their own, and do not interact with any other snakes unless they want to mate. They are crepuscular, but they may bask during the day when night-time temperatures are too low. As semi-arboreal snakes, young Boa imperator may climb into trees and shrubs to forage; however, they become mostly terrestrial as they become older and heavier. Boa imperators strike when they perceive a threat. Their bite can be painful, especially from large snakes, but is rarely dangerous to humans. Specimens from Central America are more irascible, hissing loudly and striking repeatedly when disturbed, while those from South America tame down more readily. Like all snakes, Boa imperators in a shed cycle are more unpredictable, because the substance that lubricates between the old skin and the new makes their eyes appear milky, blue or opaque, so that the snake cannot see very well, causing it to be more defensive than it might be otherwise.

Hunting and diet 
Boa imperator, like most Boa species, has a varied diet that consists mainly of mammals, birds and lizards. The size of the prey item increases as it ages.

Boa imperator, like other Boa species, are crepuscular ambush predators. They use constriction as the primary means of incapacitating their prey.

Captivity 
Boa imperator is one of the most common snakes kept in captivity; this is mainly due to their calm dispositions, impressive size potential and variety of color and pattern choices. Captive common boas often tolerate being handled for extended periods. Captive Boa imperator are generally fed pre-killed rodents in an attempt to reduce damage to the specimen from the prey and for the sake of being more humane.

This snake species has been a common species in the global pet trade since the 1980s, with 115,131 individuals being exported between 1989 and 2000.  Wild caught specimens will often contain parasites, both internal and external. The most common parasite is Ophionyssus natricis or the "reptile mite".

Boa imperator captive breeders will often breed for a specific color or "morph". There are several color and pattern morphs available in the pet trade, such as albino, hypomelanistic, motley and jungle individuals.

Notes

References

External links 
 

imperator
Snakes of Central America
Reptiles of Guatemala
Reptiles of Mexico
Reptiles of Panama
Reptiles described in 1803
Taxa named by François Marie Daudin